Carnes is an unincorporated rural small hamlet in Sioux County, in the U.S. state of Iowa.  Presently, the hamlet consists of a grain elevator and a pizza restaurant.

History 
A post office was established at Carnes in 1890, and remained in operation until it was discontinued in 1914. The community was named for Edward Carnes, a railroad roadmaster. Carnes' population was 6 in 1902, and 35 in 1925.

References

Unincorporated communities in Sioux County, Iowa
Unincorporated communities in Iowa